Paolo Litta (7 May 1871, Stockholm – 8 May 1931, Fiesole) was an Italian composer. He was of mixed Italian and Swedish heritage. He was married to the Italian opera singer, Ida Isori, and dedicated the work, Le Lac d’Amour, to her. Litta was known for having a dispute with Valentine de Saint-Point on the possibility that some ideas in de Saint-Point's La Métachorie were copied from his work, la Déesse Nue. Relatively unknown even in Italian records such as the supplementary material for Dizionario Universale dei Musicisti by Carlo Schmidl, La Morte di Cleopatra was his noticeable work to the public until his death.

Compositions
 La Déesse Nue (in addition to a separate book describing the musical work)
 Le Lac d'Amour
 La Morte di Cleopatra
 Der Tod als Fiedler

Notes

Further reading

References

External links
 

1871 births
1931 deaths
Italian composers
20th-century classical composers